Rodovia Cândido Portinari (official designation SP-334) is a State highway in the state of São Paulo. It is named after Cândido Portinari, a noted painter, who was born in the city of Brodowski.

The highway runs through these locations:

Ribeirão Preto (where it starts at SP-330)
Brodowski
Batatais
Franca - near Rifaina (division of Minas Gerais which links with another state highway)

See also
 Highway system of São Paulo
 List of state highways in São Paulo

Highways in São Paulo (state)